The 2000 Reading Borough Council election was held on 4 May 2000, at the same time as other local elections across England. Sixteen of the 45 seats on Reading Borough Council were up for election, being the usual third of the council (15 seats) plus a by-election in Kentwood ward, caused by the death of Labour councillor Doris Lawrence. At the time of the election there was another vacancy on the council in Church ward, where Labour councillor Maureen Lockey had also died, but the by-election for Church ward was not held until a few weeks later.

Labour regained the vacant seat in the Kentwood by-election, and subsequently retained the vacant seat in Church ward at the by-election on 15 June 2000. No seats changed party at these elections, leaving Labour in overall control of the council.

Results

Ward results
The results in each ward were as follows:

By-elections 2000–2001
A by-election in Church ward was held on 15 June 2000, triggered by the death of Labour councillor Maureen Lockey, who died in April 2000 ahead of the main elections that year, but there was insufficient time for the by-election to be held at the same time as the main election. The by-election was won by Christine Grieve, retaining the seat for Labour.

References

2000 English local elections
2000